The Water Rats is a live music venue at 328 Grays Inn Road, Kings Cross, London, England. Until 1992, it was known as The Pindar of Wakefield and was famous for its regular old time music hall entertainment.

Bob Dylan played his first UK gig here in December 1962. The Pogues (then known as the Pogue Mahones) had their first performance here on October 4, 1982. Oasis's debut London performance took place here on 27 January 1994. The Beta Band played their debut show here on Wednesday 23 July 1997. Acts such as Katy Perry, Sisteray, The Courteeners and Ra Ra Riot also appeared here prior to international acclaim. On October 1, 2004, the venue hosted The Decemberists, who were playing their first show outside North America. In 2014, The Water Rats began hosting a weekly quiz night. The venue reopened in October 2015 with a new management.

Originally built in 1517, when the landlord was George Green, one-time Pindar of Wakefield, who was supposed to have had connections with Robin Hood.  The present house, built in 1878, was once patronised by Karl Marx and Friedrich Engels.  Until the 1980s, it housed a regular 'Old Time Music Hall'.  In 1986, the premises were bought by the Grand Order of Water Rats and the name of the venue was changed to the Water Rats.

References

Music venues in London